Ivan Pavlovich Belyayev (born 10 August 1935) is a Soviet former athlete who competed mainly in the 3000 metre steeple chase, training at VSS Avanhard in Dnipropetrovsk.

He competed for the USSR in the 1964 Summer Olympics held in Tokyo, Japan, in the 3000 metre steeplechase where he won the bronze medal.

References

Sports Reference

External links
 

1935 births
Living people
Sportspeople from Kharkiv
Soviet male long-distance runners
Soviet male steeplechase runners
Olympic bronze medalists for the Soviet Union
Athletes (track and field) at the 1964 Summer Olympics
Olympic athletes of the Soviet Union
Medalists at the 1964 Summer Olympics
Olympic bronze medalists in athletics (track and field)